Pomeroy is a locality on the border of Goulburn Mulwaree Council and Upper Lachlan Shire in New South Wales, Australia. It lies on the upper Wollondilly River, about 23 km northwest of Goulburn and 110 km northeast of Canberra.

Pomeroy had a state school from 1868 to 1915. This was described at different times as a "public school", a "half-time school" or a "provisional school". Prior to January 1876, it was called Mummell Public School.

References

Goulburn Mulwaree Council
Localities in New South Wales
Southern Tablelands